
Year 433 BC was a year of the pre-Julian Roman calendar. At the time, it was known as the Year of the Tribunate of Vibulanus, Fidenas and Flaccinator (or, less frequently, year 321 Ab urbe condita). The denomination 433 BC for this year has been used since the early medieval period, when the Anno Domini calendar era became the prevalent method in Europe for naming years.

Events 
 By place 
 Greece 
 Pericles concludes a defensive alliance with Corcyra (Corfu), the strong naval power in the Ionian Sea, which is the bitter enemy of Corinth. As a result, Athens intervenes in the dispute between Corinth and Corcyra, and, at the Battle of Sybota, a small contingent of Athenian ships play a critical role in preventing a Corinthian fleet from capturing Corcyra. Following this, Athens places Potidaea, a tributary ally of Athens but a colony of Corinth, under siege.
 The Corinthians, upset by Athens' actions, lobby Sparta to take action against Athens. This appeal is backed by Megara (which is being severely affected by Pericles' economic sanctions) and by Aegina (which is being heavily taxed by Pericles and which has been refused home rule).
 Pericles renews alliances with the Rhegium on the southwest corner of Italy and Leontini in southeast Sicily, threatening Sparta's food supply route from Sicily.

 By topic 
 Art 
 A set of sixty-five bells, from the Tomb of Marquis Yi of Zeng (Zhou dynasty) in Suixian, Hubei, is made. It is now preserved at the Hubei Provincial Museum in Wuhan.

Births

Deaths 
 Zeng Hou Yi, marquis of the state of Zeng, subordinate to Chu

References